Acacia stigmatophylla, also known as djulurd, is a shrub belonging to the genus Acacia and the subgenus Juliflorae the is endemic to northern parts of Western Australia.

Description
The glabrous, angular to flattened branchlets have red-brown to light brown colour and have resinous ridges. The straight, green phyllodes have a narrowly elliptic to oblanceolate shape. It blooms from January to October producing yellow flowers. The cupular flowers widely spaced and the petals have a prominent midrib. After flowering brown woody, narrowly oblanceolate, flat, seed pods form that are basally narrowed form.

Distribution
It is native to a large area in the Kimberley region of Western Australia from around Broome and east to the border with the Northern Territory where it is situated in a large variety of habitat growing in sometimes skeletal sandy soils over granite, sandstone or quartzite as a part of coastal monsoon forest on the hills and ranges above savannah grassland or open Eucalyptus woodland communities.

See also
List of Acacia species

References

stigmatophylla
Acacias of Western Australia
Plants described in 1842
Taxa named by George Bentham